Mexico is scheduled to compete at the 2023 Central American and Caribbean Games in San Salvador, El Salvador from June 23 to July 8, 2023. This will be Mexico's 24th appearance at the Central American and Caribbean Games, having competed at every Games since the inaugural edition in 1926.

Archery 

Mexico qualified twelve athletes during the Central American And Caribbean Games 2023 CQT in Bayamón, Puerto Rico.

 Men

 Women

 Mixed

Artistic swimming 

Mexico qualified 11 athletes during the Campeonatos Centroamericanos CCCAN 2022 in Panama City, Panama.

Athletics

Badminton 

Mexico qualified a team of eight badminton athletes (four per gender).

 Men

 Women

 Mixed

Baseball 

Team roster

Basketball 

Mexico qualified two teams, one per gender of twelve athletes each one.

Men's tournament 

Summary

 Squad

Women's tournament 

Summary

 Squad

3x3 Basquetball 
Mexico qualified two teams, one per gender of four  athletes each one.

Team Tournaments

Beach Soccer

Men's 
Summary

Squad

Women's 
Summary

Squad

Beach Volleyball

Bodybuilding 

Mexico qualified a full team of two bodybuilders (one male and one female).

Bowling 
Mexico qualified twelve bowlers, six per gender.

Boxing

Canoeing

Chess

Cycling

BMX

Mountain biking

Road

Track 
Sprint and Pursuit

Keirin

Madison

Omnium

BMX

Diving 

 Men

 Women

Equestrian

Fencing

Field Hockey

Football

Golf

Gymnastics

Artistic 

 Men
 Team 

 Women
 Team

Rhythmic 

 Individual

 Group

Trampoline 
Mexico qualified a team of three gymnasts in trampoline (two men and one woman).

Handball

Judo

Karate

Modern Pentathlon

Netball

Raquetball

Rowing 

 Men

 Women

Mixed

Rugby Sevens

Men's tournament 
Summary

Squad

Women's tournament 

Summary

Squad

Sailing 

 Men

 Women

 Mixed

Shooting

Softball 

Team roster

Speed skating

Surf

Swimming

Table Tennis

Taekwondo

Tennis

Triathlon

Volleyball

Men's 
Summary

Squad

Women's 
Summary

Squad

Weightlifting

Wrestling

References 

2023
2023 in Mexican sports